Below is a list of former characters in long-running Channel 4 soap opera Hollyoaks. They are in order of years of their last appearance. For present characters, see list of Hollyoaks characters.



2020s

Last appeared in 2023

Last appeared in 2022

Last appeared in 2021

Last appeared in 2020

2010s

Last appeared in 2019

Last appeared in 2018

Last appeared in 2017

Last appeared in 2016

Last appeared in 2015

Last appeared in 2014

Last appeared in 2013

Last appeared in 2012

Last appeared in 2011

Last appeared in 2010

2000s

Last appeared in 2009

Last appeared in 2008

Last appeared in 2007

Last appeared in 2006

Last appeared in 2005

Last appeared in 2004

Last appeared in 2003

Last appeared in 2002

Last appeared in 2001

Last appeared in 2000

1990s

Last appeared in 1999

Last appeared in 1997

Last appeared in 1996

External links
 Character profiles at Channel4.com
 Cast and characters of Hollyoaks on IMDb

 
Lists of former characters